Chandrashekhar H. Vijayashankar (born 21 October 1956) was a member of the 14th Lok Sabha of India. He represented the Mysore constituency of Karnataka and is a member of the Bharatiya Janata Party political party. He was elected member of Karnataka legislative assembly from Hunsur in 1994. In 1998, he was elected to the 12th Lok Sabha from Mysore Lok Sabha constituency.

He was re-elected to Mysore Lok Sabha constituency in 2004 against Srikantadatta Narasimharaja Wadiyar, who was the prince of Mysore Kingdom and head of the Wadiyar dynasty that ruled the Kingdom of Mysore between 1399 and 1950.

He served as a cabinet minister in the government of Karnataka holding the following portfolios: forest department from forest, ecology & environment department as well as small scale industries from C & I department.

He unsuccessfully contested the 2014 Lok Sabha elections from Hassan constituency in 2014 as a Bharatiya Janata Party candidate against former Prime Minister H. D. Deve Gowda.

He was a member of the Karnataka Legislative Council from 15 June 2010 till the end of his tenure in Jan 2016.

He resigned from Bharatiya Janata Party and joined Indian National Congress in October 2017. He rejoined Bharatiya Janta Party in November 2019.

See also 

 List of members of the 14th Lok Sabha (by state)

External links
 Members of Fourteenth Lok Sabha - Parliament of India website

References

Living people
1956 births
Bharatiya Janata Party politicians from Karnataka
India MPs 1998–1999
India MPs 2004–2009
Politicians from Mysore
Lok Sabha members from Karnataka
People from Haveri
National Democratic Alliance candidates in the 2014 Indian general election